Reginald George Haggar (1905–1988) R.I., A.R.C.A., F.R.S.A. was a British ceramic designer. He was born in Ipswich and studied at Ipswich School of Art and the Royal College of Art. In 1929, he became assistant designer at Mintons pottery in Stoke-on-Trent, rising to art director six months later, a post he held until 1939. Working in water colours and ceramics, his designs reflected both the radical and lyrical elements of the Art Deco style.

After leaving Mintons, he became Master-in-Charge of the Stoke School of Art to 1941 and then of Burslem School of Art until 
1945.

Thereafter he was a freelance artist and lecturer in the Potteries area. He painted many pictures of the north Staffordshire area. An annual ceramics lecture has been held in his memory each year called the Reginald Haggar Memorial Lecture given these days at The Potteries Museum & Art Gallery.

Publications
 Recent ceramic sculpture in Great Britain, J. Tiranti ltd, 1946
 English Pottery Figures, 1660-1860, J. Tiranti (printed by Barnard & Westwood), 1947
 A new guide to old pottery: English country pottery, M. M. McBride, 1950
 English Country Pottery, Phoenix House, 1950
 The Masons of Lane Delph and the origin of Masons patent ironstone, Printed for G.L. Ashworth & Bros. by P.L. Humphries, 1952
 Staffordshire chimney ornaments, Phoenix House, 1955
 Pottery Through the Ages, Roy Publishers, 1959
 Sculpture through the ages, London: Methuen, 1960
 Glass and glassmakers, London: Methuen, 1961
 A dictionary of art terms: painting, sculpture, architecture, Oldbourne Press, 1962
 The Concise Encyclopedia of Continental Pottery and Porcelain, Praeger, 1968
 with Elizabeth Adams, Mason porcelain and ironstone 1796-1853, Miles Mason and the Mason Manufactories, London: Faber, 1977

See also
 Susie Cooper
 Gordon Forsyth
 Burslem School of Art

External links
 Stoke-on-Trent Museums: Reginald Haggar
 Victoria & Albert Museum: Reginald Haggar collection

References

1905 births
1988 deaths
20th-century ceramists
English ceramicists
English designers
Alumni of the Royal College of Art
Artists from Ipswich